Éric Aubourg is a French astrophysicist at the Commissariat à l'Énergie Atomique and a member of the APC/Université Paris-Diderot Cosmology Group.  He has made several published contributions to the field of Egyptology, including a dating of the Dendera zodiac, whose age was the center of a significant archaeological debate in the 1800s.  It is also likely he is the author of MacScribe, a hieroglyph typesetting software for Macintosh, since it originated from the same department he collaborated with on the Dendera dating, and is attributed to someone with his name.

Egyptology Publications

References

French physicists
French Egyptologists
Living people
Year of birth missing (living people)